Muldaur is a surname. Notable people with the name include:

 Diana Muldaur (born 1938), American television and film actress
 Geoff Muldaur (born 1943), American folk singer, guitarist, and composer
 Maria Muldaur (born 1943), American folk and blues singer

See also

 
 Mulder (surname)
 Moulder (disambiguation)
 Molder (disambiguation)